The Blackpool Illuminations is an annual lights festival with over one million light bulbs. Founded in 1879 and held each autumn from August until November they are on for 66 nights a year. In 1934, the town began a tradition of marking the start of the festival by hosting a public figure to perform the inaugural switch-on of the lights. For the first public ceremony, the honor was performed by Lord Derby. In subsequent years, hosts have predominantly been drawn from the world of entertainment with occasional appearances by sportspeople and political figures. Unusual hosts have included a Canberra bomber aircraft in 1969 and racehorse Red Rum in 1977. For the 2023 Blackpool Illuminations the times of which the illuminations will be on will be revealed at a later date

List of switch on hosts

References

Tourist attractions in Blackpool
Blackpool Illuminations